Jonathan Arias Tenorio (born 18 April 1986, in Toluca, Mexico) is a Mexican footballer, who plays as central defender for Club Toluca of Primera División de México.

Arias started his career in the Toluca youth team until catching the eye of the then Toluca coach Americo Gallego. Gallego was so impressed by Arias' leaping ability and fast reaction time that he described Arias as someone who in the future could be called the "Mexican Cannavaro", making reference to Italy's World Cup winning captain Fabio Cannavaro.

Arias made his debut with the Toluca senior squad on 20 August 2006 in a 3–0 home victory over Gallos Blancos de Querétaro FC. He played the full 90 minutes of the match. He impressed Gallego in that game with his good decision making and composure. He was included in the team in nine out of the next 15 league games. After Gallego left Toluca, Arias has had few appearances with the major team.

External links

1986 births
Living people
People from Toluca
Footballers from the State of Mexico
Association football central defenders
Deportivo Toluca F.C. players
Atlético Mexiquense footballers
Liga MX players
Mexican footballers